Tazeh Kand-e Rezaabad (also Romanized as Tāzeh Kand-e Reẕāābād; also known as Reẕāābād) is a village in Kalkharan Rural District, in the Central District of Ardabil County, Ardabil Province, Iran. At the 2006 census, its population was 141, in 35 families.

References 

Towns and villages in Ardabil County